Ogygia (or  Ōgygíā ) is an island mentioned in Homer's Odyssey, Book V, as the home of the nymph Calypso, the daughter of the Titan Atlas. In Homer's Odyssey, Calypso detained Odysseus on Ogygia for seven years and kept him from returning to his home of Ithaca, wanting to marry him.

Athena complained about Calypso's actions to Zeus, who sent the messenger Hermes to Ogygia to order Calypso to release Odysseus. Hermes is Odysseus's great grandfather on his mother's side, through Autolycos. Calypso finally, though reluctantly, instructed Odysseus to build a small raft, gave him food and wine, and let him depart the island.

The Odyssey describes Ogygia as follows:

Location

Ogygia or Phaeacia has been associated with the putative sunken Atlantis. A long-standing tradition begun by Euhemerus in the late 4th century BC and supported by Callimachus,<ref>Strabo 7.3.6, referencing Callimachus' account in relation to Euhemerus. Also, Ernle Bradford (1963), Ulysses Found'.'</ref> endorsed by modern Maltese tradition, identifies Ogygia with the island of Gozo, the second largest island in the Maltese archipelago.

Aeschylus calls the Nile Ogygian, and Eustathius the Byzantine grammarian said that Ogygia was the earliest name for Egypt, while other suggested locations for Ogygia include the Ionian Sea.

Maps of historians and geographers Philipp Clüver and Petrus Bertius refer to Ogygia as an island northwest of Corfu, Ionian Islands, Greece, which adds fuel to modern Greek tradition that Ogygia is, indeed, the same island as the island of Othonoi.

Geographical account by Strabo

Approximately seven centuries after Homer, the Alexandrian geographer Strabo criticized Polybius on the geography of the Odyssey. Strabo proposed that Scheria and Ogygia were located in the middle of the Atlantic Ocean.

Geographical account by Plutarch

Plutarch also gives an account of the location of Ogygia:

The passage of Plutarch has created some controversy. W. Hamilton indicated the similarities of Plutarch's account on "the great continent" and Plato's location of Atlantis in Timaeus 24E – 25A. Kepler in his Kepleri Astronomi Opera Omnia estimated that “the great continent” was America and attempted to locate Ogygia and the surrounding islands. Ruaidhrí Ó Flaithbheartaigh used Ogygia as a synonym for Ireland in the title of his Irish history, Ogygia: Seu Rerum Hibernicarum Chronologia ("Ogygia: Or a Chronological Account of Irish Events"), 1685. Wilhelm von Christ was convinced that the continent was America and states that in the 1st-century sailors traveling through Iceland, Greenland, and the Baffin Region reached the North American coast.

Primeval OgygiaOgygia is associated with the Ogygian deluge and with the mythological figure Ogyges, in the sense that the word Ogygian means "primeval", "primal", and "at earliest dawn", which would suggest that Homer's Ogygia was a primeval island. However, Ogyges as a primeval, aboriginal ruler was usually sited in Boeotia, where he founded Thebes there, naming it Ogygia at the time.
In another account of Ogyges, he brought his people to the area first known as Acte. That land was subsequently called Ogygia in his honor but ultimately known as Attica.

Ogygia is used by Roderick O'Flaherty  as an allegory for Ireland in his book  published in 1685 as Ogygia: seu Rerum Hibernicarum Chronologia & etc., in 1793 translated into English by Rev. James Hely, as "Ogygia, or a Chronological account of Irish Events (collected from Very Ancient Documents faithfully compared with each other & supported by the Genealogical & Chronological Aid of the Sacred and Profane Writings of the Globe”.

Namesake
Ogygia Island in Antarctica is named after the mythical island.

In popular culture
Ogygia appears in the books The Battle of the Labyrinth, The House of Hades and The Blood of Olympus of Rick Riordan's Camp Half-Blood Chronicles. Main characters Percy Jackson and Leo Valdez land on the island in The Battle of the Labyrinth and The House of Hades, respectively, where they remain trapped for a while until Calypso falls in love with them, which summons a magical raft to take the heroes away. In The Blood of Olympus'', Leo returns to Ogygia to rescue Calypso using a magical astrolabe that had been created by Odysseus for just such a purpose, although Odysseus had never been able to complete it.

Notes

External links

Plutarch - Concerning the Face Which Appears in the Orb of the Moon

Mythological islands
Geography of the Odyssey
Locations in Greek mythology
Calypso (mythology)